Hubert Lafayette Sone, (1892–1970), Soong (or Sung) Hsu-Peh in Chinese, was an American Methodist missionary in China. He was a professor of Old Testament at Nanjing Theological Seminary during the Japanese invasion in 1937. Sone was among the small group of foreigners who remained in the city and provided aid to the Chinese victims of the Japanese atrocities. He served with John Rabe on the International Committee for the Nanking Safety Zone and was Associate Food Commissioner. On 18 February 1938 the name of the committee was changed to the "Nanjing International Relief Committee." After the departure of George Fitch, Sone was elected Director of the Nanjing International Relief Committee. For their actions in support of the Chinese people, Sone and thirteen other Americans were awarded "The Order of the Blue Jade" by the Chinese government.

Early life and call to ministry 

Hubert Lafayette Sone was born in Denton, Texas, in the United States, on 7 June 1892, to J. William and Martha Anne Ballew Sone.

Southern Methodist University (SMU) in Dallas, Texas, was founded in 1911, however the first class was delayed until 1915 due to construction. Sone was among the seven hundred students admitted to the inaugural class and received a Bachelor of Arts from SMU in 1916. After serving in the U.S. Army, Sone was licensed to preach by the Methodist Episcopal Church South District Conference on 7 May 1918. With the support of Highland Park Methodist Church in Dallas, Texas, known today as Highland Park United Methodist Church, Sone applied to the Board of Missions of the Methodist Episcopal Church South, for an assignment as a missionary to China. He married Katie Helen Jackson in Chillicothe, Texas on 15 June 1918.

Leaving the United States for China 

The Sones departed the United States in April 1920 for the mission field in China.  They arrived in Shanghai to begin their new life of ministry and teaching in China in May 1920.

The Methodist Episcopal Church South mission in China was opened in Shanghai by C. Taylor, M.D. and J. Jenkins, D.D. in 1848 and 1849 respectively. They were followed by six others until 1860. Because of the Civil War in America no missionaries came to China until 1875. The missionary work was "evangelistic, educational, medical, literary, woman's work, etc."  As of 1906 there were sixty missionaries in the field, including wives of missionaries and the representatives of the Woman's Board. The field of endeavor included the southern end of Kiangsu and the northern end of Zhejiang Provinces, one of the most densely populated regions in China.

Studying the Chinese language and missionary work 

Sone's first assignment was Chinese language study at Soochow University in Suzhou (then romanized as "Soochow"). In addition to his language studies, Rev. Sone was assigned to Huzhou to build a Methodist Mission station. Language studies were interrupted in 1921 when Hubert Sone traveled to Dezhou in Shandong Province to do famine relief work, driving a rice truck from village to village.

The Sones embarked on their first trip back to the United States on 24 June 1925, sailing from Shanghai via Hawaii to San Francisco. During this time, Hubert Sone received a Bachelor of Divinity (B.D.) and a Master of Arts degree (M.A.) in 1926 and in 1927 both from Southern Methodist University. In 1928, Sone was made Superintendent of the Institutional Church in Huzhou. On 27 April 1933, Bishop Paul B. Kern appointed Sone to the faculty of the Nanking Theological Seminary, today known as the Nanjing Union Theological Seminary upon his return to China. In the summer of 1934 the Sones returned to Huzhou, China.

Missionary work in China – Nanjing 

After leaving Huzhou and moving to Nanjing, Sone taught four courses at the seminary; one in Mandarin; two in English, and one in Hebrew. During this time, Helen Sone taught first and second grade in the Nanjing American School.

The Imperial Japanese Army reign of terror 

Nanjing Datusha
南京大屠殺
13 December 1937 – 18 February 1938

The Second Sino-Japanese War began in July 1937 after several incidents in northern China.  Air raids by the Imperial Japanese Army (IJA) began in Nanjing on 15 August 1937, and school started at Nanjing Theological Seminary on 30 September 1937. Much like Londoners during the blitz by the Germans that began on Sept. 7, 1940, the residents, students and faculty of Nanjing Theological Seminary repaired to the shelters when the air raid warnings sounded. The Imperial Japanese Army captured the port city of Shanghai in November 1937, and the Chinese and foreign residents of Nanjing braced themselves for the coming invasion. Meanwhile, in November 1937, Sone sent his wife and children to Mount Mogan, providing them relative safety, while he remained in Nanjing. The family arrived at the base of the mountain and took a rickshaw up to Moganshan.

In spite of Chinese and foreign news accounts of the destruction of Suzhou, (which lay on the IJA path between Shanghai and Nanjing) no one was ready for the scope of brutality by the IJA that followed. Some historical accounts indicate Suzhou was reduced in population from 350,000 to 500. Part of this could be attributed to Chinese fleeing the city, but the exact number of Chinese casualties may never be known.

On Sunday, 28 November 1937, uncertainty hung over the city of Nanjing. Some felt the Japanese would arrive in days, some thought it would be weeks. Prudent steps were taken to preserve order; some of the city gates were closed to keep out Chinese soldiers and the wounded were no longer being brought into the city. A meeting was called at the U.S. Embassy which Sone attended:

At 10 A.M was at a conference over at Embassy. Others present, Sone of Seminary; Fitch, Y.M.C.A.; Bates of University, and Trimmer of Hospital. Mr. Paxton spoke of possibility of looting soldiers and the danger to foreigners. Said that as many as possible should leave at once, and those who cannot leave immediately should be prepared to go out when and if Embassy leaves for U.S.S. Panay. If city gates are closed two places were designated as points for going down over city wall by ropes. Each person was then asked to report for himself and group. Searl (M.S. Bates) and I feel that our responsibilities make it necessary to stay through. Our explanations were accepted and respected....

On 9 December 1937, Japanese troops launched the attack upon the city of Nanjing.  For safety, a group of missionaries, including Sone, left their homes and moved into the Pearl Buck home. The  was escorting U.S. residents out of the city when it was sunk by the Japanese on 12 December. The Sone family assumed Hubert Sone was on that ship evacuating with the other Americans. However, Sone had decided to stay in Nanjing and was one of the fourteen Americans who remained in Nanjing and witnessed the events of the monstrous horror.

By 13 December 1937 the Japanese troops entered the city and began what is known as the Nanjing Massacre.  Historians generally agree that as many as 300,000 civilian Chinese were shot, bayoneted, and burned. As many as 20,000 innocent women, young and old, even children, were raped, and mutilated. Sone was one of twenty-seven Western nationals in Nanjing who experienced its fall and witnessed the ensuing massacre. In a letter to Professor P.F. Price, Sone described what was happening in Nanjing:

There has been nothing or no one safe. Soldiers have taken anything they wanted, destroyed what they did not want, raped women and girls openly and publicly by the scores and hundreds. Those who opposed them were bayoneted or shot on the spot. Women who have opposed being raped, have been bayoneted. Children who have interfered have also been bayoneted. One woman who was being raped on Frank's place—there have been about 150 people staying at his house—had her four or five months old baby near her, and it cried, so the soldier raping her smothered it to death. One refugee girl in the B.T.T.S. was raped 17 times. Finally we got Japanese guards stationed at the gates of the larger compounds, but they often themselves go in and rape women.  Every day and night brings forth repeated cases. These cases have occurred by the hundreds—they make a tale of horror almost indescribable.

In a letter to Rev. Marshal T. Steel, Pastor of Highland Park Methodist Church, today Highland Park United Methodist Church, in Dallas, Texas, US, on 14 March 1938 Sone said:

The Japanese soldiers came into the city in quite large numbers on Monday Dec. 13th. Many civilians were killed on the spot—shot or bayoneted. Everyone who ran, and many were frightened on the first appearance of the troops, was immediately shot. On the afternoon of Monday I went down the street on my bike, and saw many dead and dying along the road. I sent a number of them to the hospital in the ambulance.

In a letter to his missionary colleague, Dr. A.W. Wasson, Sone related:

They shot and bayoneted on the spot and without question anyone whom they might consider to be a soldier.   As a result, great numbers of people were shot down, even though in civilian clothes ... The streets were literally littered with the dead.  The next few days—in fact two weeks or more, and even until the present, the military have been busily engaged in weeding out all the Chinese soldiers.  These have been taken in groups of tens, fifties, hundred, and several hundreds at a time, and machine gunned and bayoneted en masse.  Many of them were thus dispatched on the bank of the Yangtse River, and their bodies tumbled into the river to be carried off by the rushing waters.  Others were burned in heaps.  Some of them tumbled into pits.

In light of more horrific crimes, looting seems almost trivial but during this time, it was rampant, and both Chinese and foreigners were victims.  Minnie Vautrin, a professor at Ginling College, and later described as "the Living Goddess of Mercy" for her role defending the Chinese, picked Sone up in her vehicle after the Japanese had stolen Sone's car.

A little past Hillcrest saw Mr. Sone on road and took him into the car.  Said his car had just been taken—he had left it out in front of his house when he went in for a few minutes.  There was an American Flag on it and it was locked.

Physical violence against foreigners was also not uncommon. On 23 December, around 5 p.m., two Japanese soldiers approached a residence belonging to the Nanjing Theological Seminary, an American institution. As they began to occupy the property by force the soldiers struck and manhandled Hubert Sone, who was a member of the faculty and Chair of the Property Committee of the seminary.  Sone reported this incident to the Japanese Embassy:

I wish to report that on yesterday afternoon, December 23rd, about 5:00 o'clock, two Japanese soldiers entered the premises of No. 2 Shanghai Road, took down the American flag and hoisted a banner stating that this house is to be the residence of the Investigating Committee.
This house at No. 2 Shanghai Road is American property.  It is the residence of Prof. R. A. Felton of the Nanking Theological Seminary, and also has stored in it the household and personal effect of Prof. C. S. Smith, and Prof. Edward James, both of our Seminary.
The proclamation placed on the front gate by the Japanese Embassy was removed just a few minutes before I found these soldiers taking down the American flag.  The American Embassy proclamation was still displayed in a prominent place.  One of the soldiers was obviously drunk.  They insisted that they wanted to borrow the place for ten days, which I declined to grant.  They then became very angry and rough with me, shouting and striking me on the shoulder, and finally by force took hold of me and dragged me across the yard and out into the middle of Shanghai Road.  It was only after I agreed to sign a statement allowing them to borrow the house for two weeks that they would release me.  After signing this statement, they released me, and allowed us to raise again the American flag.  But they put their banner on the front gate and said they would return today at 9:00 o'clock and occupy the house.  They ordered the Chinese refugees who are living in the house at present to move out completely.

Establishment of the Nanjing Safety Zone 

A "safety zone" had been implemented in Shanghai by a French, Catholic Priest, Father Robert Jacquinot de Besange, in August 1937. It was a successful model and the Nanking Safety Zone (南京安全区) began organizational efforts in November 1937.

On 22 November 1937, trusting their privileged status as third-party nationals, those remaining foreigners voluntarily organized a committee called the "International Committee for the Nanking Safety Zone" to provide Chinese people with refuge and relief. They elected a German businessman of Siemens China Corporation, John Rabe, as its chair presumably for not only his character, but also his status as a Nazi. Japan and Germany had signed the bilateral Anti-Comintern Pact in 1936.

The Nanjing Safety Zone was established in the western district of the city. It was composed of a score of refugee camps that occupied an area of about 3.4 square miles (8.6 square kilometers). On 1 December 1937, Mayor Ma Chaochun of Nanjing met the International Committee and authorized them to take over the city administration once he and his staff were evacuated. Unlike Shanghai, the Japanese never gave assurance that the Nanjing Safety Zone would not either be attacked. In spite of this the International Committee issued "an open letter to the residents of Nanjing on Dec. 8, 1937." Residents of Nanjing began streaming into the safety zone and ultimately "over ninety percent of the city's population crowded into it."

Sone was Chairman of the Property Committee of the Nanjing Theological Seminary. He also was Associate Food Commissioner of the International Committee for the Nanjing Safety Zone. He delivered rice to the refugee camps, driving the rice truck personally. To a missionary colleague Sone wrote of the looting, rape, murder, burning and destruction caused by the Japanese.

With the coming of the Japanese soldiers we thought order would soon be restored, and peace would come, and people would be able to return to their homes and get back to normal life again.  But the surprise of surprises came to us all.  Robbery, looting, torture, murder, rape, burning—everything that can be imagined was carried out from the very beginning without any limit.  Modern times have nothing to surpass it. Nanking has been almost a living hell.

Sone attempted to prevent assaults on Chinese civilians and was beaten by the Japanese soldiers. He filed protest letters with the Japanese embassy in Nanjing, the United States Embassy and tried to alert the outside world through correspondence with colleagues in the United States. On 18 February the official name of the International Committee for the Nanjing Safety Zone was changed to the "Nanjing International Relief Committee."   After George Fitch departed, Sone was elected Administrative Director of the Nanjing International Relief Committee.  During the attack on Nanjing, Sone's family, Helen, and the two children remained on Moganshan.

Order of the Blue Jade 

In 1939 the Chinese government awarded Sone and thirteen other Americans, one of China's highest civilian awards for valor, the "Order of the Blue Jade" for their humanitarian efforts.  Sometimes referred to as the Star of the Jade Order, or Emblem of the Blue Jade, this beautiful gold and dark and light blue jade medallion was designed like a traditional military medal; to be draped over the neck hanging over the chest by a red, white, and blue silk ribbon.

Sone's award came in a black lacquer box with red silk lining inside. The box was personalized with the Chinese character for Sung (Sone). The box also contained the Chinese characters for Silk Neck Piece, Beautiful Jade, Meritorious Official Decoration with the number 131 on the back of the box. Much as decorated military veterans dismiss their awards for valor, Sone never discussed the award with his family in the years after the event.

Before Sone left China in 1951, he disposed of the award in Nanjing. In a letter to his parents he described the medal and alluded that he discarded it to avoid any further difficulty leaving China. However, he drew a picture of the medal, the lapel pin, and box in which it was presented and mailed this in a letter to his parents in the United States.

Return to Nanjing and relief work 

The years 1938 through 1941 represented a return to teaching and also the work of the Nanjing International Relief Committee, of which Sone was now the director. Sone continued his work in Nanjing with the Nanking International Relief Committee, formerly the International Committee for the Nanking Safety Zone. It is estimated that the committee served "about 11,000 families."

Return to the United States and WW II 

On 3 May 1941, Sone sailed on the "President Pierce" steamer for a furlough in the United States, arriving on 21 May 1941. The Sone family settled in Chicago where Hubert Sone enrolled in a doctoral program at The University of Chicago. For the United States, World War II began 7 December 1941 which indefinitely postponed returning to China.

Return to China – Nanjing 

In 1946, after World War II had ended, the Sones returned to their old home at 89 Mo Tsou Road in Nanjing. They resumed the duties of teaching, relief work, preaching in the churches, and music lessons taught by Helen Sone.  Hubert Sone led an effort in 1948 to feed 15,000 refugees in Nanjing.

Leaving China for the last time 

On 1 October 1949, Mao Zedong declared the advent of the People's Republic of China (PRC).  The United States then suspended diplomatic ties, for decades. In 1950, the United States recalled its ambassador and urged United States citizens to leave China. On 25 June 1950, the struggle between North and South Korea became an international conflict with the adoption of the United Nations Security Council Resolution 83 and the entry of the United States into the Korean War. On 2 December 1950, Sone requested an exit visa from the People's Republic of China (PRC). The Chinese government required departing foreigners to advertise in the paper for three days in the event there was an outstanding issue someone wished to bring. While others were granted visas, the Sone's visa was delayed and he was informed that his request was sent to Beijing for consideration. Finally in April, 1951 the Sones were allowed to leave after much of their personal effects were confiscated, such as Helen's One Thousand Flowers pattern dishes, all United States currency, his field glasses and radio with a comment that it could be used to send signals. On 12 April the Sones arrived in Hong Kong, the last American missionaries to leave Nanjing. On their fourth furlough, they departed Hong Kong on 8 May 1951 for San Francisco on board the SS "President Wilson", never to return to China.

Trinity Theological College, Singapore, Malaya 

After being in the US for a little over one year, the Sones left New York City by boat in 1952 for a new assignment, Trinity College, today known as Trinity Theological College, in Singapore, Malaya.   Here the Sones would make their home for the next nine years. Today the institution is known as Trinity Theological College (TTC).  It "serves all Christian churches and denominations by educating and equipping Christian leaders for the manifold ministries of the church across Asia."

During his tenure in Singapore at Trinity College, Sone served as a faculty member, Dean, then Principal of Trinity Theological College.  He also preached at local churches, and served as Secretary of the Trustees of the Methodist Church in Malaysia.

Retirement, death and legacy 

In 1961, the Sones return to the United States and retired from active mission work after forty one years of service. For the next nine years Sone preached at area churches and travelled widely, lecturing on the work of the Methodist Church in Asia.

Hubert Sone's everlasting legacy is the inspiring humanitarian work done to assist the Chinese during the events in Nanjing from 1937–1938.  Hubert and Helen Sone dedicated their own lives, not only to the church and the Methodist mission in China, but to the Chinese people and to Malaysians in Singapore. Hubert and Helen Sone's support of the Chinese people at personal risk, and their dedication to the calling of being missionaries, will forever enshrine their love of the Chinese people and their Christian faith.

Hubert L. Sone died in Fort Worth, Texas, USA on 6 September 1970 at age 78. On 18 October 1982, Helen Jackson Sone died in Fort Worth, Texas, USA at the age of 89.

References

Bibliography 

A Century of Protestant Missions in China (1807–1907) Edited by Donald MacGillivray, Printed at the American Presbyterian Mission Press, Shanghai, 1907

China Mission Year Book, Edited by the National Christian Council, Editor, Henry T. Hodgkin, M.D., Shanghai, Christian Literature Society

They Were in Nanjing-The Nanjing Massacre Witnessed by American and British Nationals, by Suping Lu, Hong Kong University Press, 2004

Terror in Minnie Vautrin's Nanjing-Dairies and Correspondence, 1937-38-Minnie Vautrin Edited and with an Introduction by Suping Lu, University of Illinois Press, Urbana and Chicago, 2008.

Chang, Iris, The Rape of Nanking: The Forgotten Holocaust of World War II, Foreword by William C. Kirby; Penguin USA (Paper), 1998.

Further reading 

The Woman Who Could Not Forget: Iris Chang Before and Beyond the Rape of Nanking
Pegasus Books, LLC, 80 Broad Street, 5th Floor, New York, NY 100004, 2011

Fogel, Joshua A. (2000). The Nanjing Massacre in history and historiography. Berkeley: University of California Press. p. 248..
Timothy Brook, "Introduction: Documenting the Rape of Nanking," in Documents on the Rape of Nanking, 3

Askew, David. "The International Committee for the Nanking Safety Zone: An Introduction" Sino-Japanese Studies Vol. 14, April 2002 (Article outlining membership and their reports of the events that transpired during the massacre)

Askew, David, "The Nanjing Incident: An Examination of the Civilian Population" Sino-Japanese Studies Vol. 13, March 2001 (Article analyzes a wide variety of figures on the population of Nanking before, during, and after the massacre)

Bergamini, David, "Japan's Imperial Conspiracy," William Morrow, New York; 1971.
Galbraith, Douglas, A Winter in China, London, 2006. . A novel focussing on the western residents of Nanking during the massacre.

Hsū Shuhsi, ed. (1939), Documents of the Nanking Safety Zone (reprinted in Documents on the Rape of Nanjing Brook ed. 1999)

Qi, Shouhua. "When the Purple Mountain Burns: A Novel" San Francisco: Long River Press, 2005. 

Qi, Shouhua. Purple Mountain: A Story of the Rape of Nanking(A Novel) English Chinese Bilingual Edition (Paperback, 2009)

Rabe, John, The Good Man of Nanking: The Diaries of John Rabe, Vintage (Paper), 2000. 

Robert Sabella, Fei Fei Li and David Liu, eds. Nanking 1937: Memory and Healing (Armonk, NY: M.E. Sharpe, 2002). .

Young, Shi; Yin, James. "Rape of Nanking: Undeniable history in photographs" Chicago: Innovative Publishing Group, 1997.

Zhang, Kaiyuan, ed. Eyewitnesses to Massacre, An East Gate Book, 2001 (includes documentation of American missionaries M.S. Bates, G.A. Fitch, E.H. Foster, J.G. Magee, J.H. MaCallum, W.P. Mills, L.S.C. Smyth, A.N. Steward, Minnie Vautrin and R.O. Wilson.) 

Brook, Timothy, ed. Documents on the Rape of Nanjing, Ann Arbor: The University of Michigan Press, 1999.  (Does not include the Rabe diaries but does include reprints of "Hsu Shuhsi, Documents of the Nanking Safety Zone, Kelly & Walsh, 1939".)

Hua-ling Hu, American Goddess at the Rape of Nanking: The Courage of Minnie Vautrins, Foreword by Paul Simon; March 2000, 

American Methodist missionaries
Methodist missionaries in China
1882 births
1970 deaths
American expatriates in China
Southern Methodist University alumni
People assisting Chinese during the Nanjing Massacre